Allan Raymond Jensen (born November 27, 1958) is a Canadian former ice hockey goaltender.

Selected 31st overall by the Detroit Red Wings in the 1978 NHL Entry Draft, Jensen only played one game for the Red Wings before he was traded to the Washington Capitals in July 1981 in exchange for Mark Lofthouse. It was with the Capitals that he was given the chance to blossom into a starting goaltender, and helped guide the team to its first playoff appearance, in the 1982–83 NHL season. The next season Jensen achieved even more as he was a co-winner of the William M. Jennings Trophy with teammate Pat Riggin.

Jensen played almost six seasons with the Capitals before he was traded to the Los Angeles Kings in the middle of the 1986–87 NHL season in exchange for defenseman Garry Galley. He played one season with the New Haven Nighthawks of the AHL before retiring from active professional play. In 179 NHL games, Jensen posted a 95-53-18 regular season record.

Career statistics

Regular season and playoffs

International

References

External links

1958 births
Living people
Adirondack Red Wings players
Binghamton Whalers players
Canadian ice hockey goaltenders
Detroit Red Wings draft picks
Detroit Red Wings players
Hershey Bears players
Ice hockey people from Ontario
Los Angeles Kings players
New Haven Nighthawks players
Sportspeople from Hamilton, Ontario
Washington Capitals players
William M. Jennings Trophy winners